The Provinces of Nigeria were administrative divisions in Nigeria, in use from 1900 to 1967 in Colonial Nigeria and shortly after independence. They were altered many times through their history. They were divided into divisions; some of these were further subdivided into native authorities. Northern Nigeria and Southern Nigeria were also sometimes known as the Northern Provinces or Southern Provinces respectively. Currently, Nigeria is a federation of 36 states.

The first use of provinces was in Northern Nigeria after Britain took over administration of the area from the Royal Niger Company in 1900. The British originally divided the area into eleven provinces which were:
Bauchi
Bida
Bornu
Kabba
Kontagora
Lower Benue or Nassarawa 
Illorin
Muri
Sokoto
Upper Bema
Zaria

In 1903 six more provinces were added; five following the Sokoto-Kano campaign, and also Gwandu province, making a total of 17. The number of provinces was reduced to 13 in 1911, and 12 after World War I.  In 1926 Adamawa and Plateau became new provinces. The provinces and divisions in 1945, with the names or number of Native Authorities in each division:

There were thirteen provinces in Northern Nigeria in 1966 which were abolished in May 1967:

Bauchi
Benue
Borno
Ilorin
Kano
Katsina
Plateau
Zaria
Niger
Adamawa
Kabba
Sokoto
Sardauna

References
Nigerian archives
Statoids, Nigeria
Northern Nigeria
Eastern Nigeria
Western Nigeria

Former Nigerian administrative divisions